The 1977 World Table Tennis Championships – Swaythling Cup (men's team) was the 34th edition of the men's team championship.  

China won the gold medal defeating Japan 5–0 in the final. Sweden won the bronze medal.

Medalists

Swaythling Cup tables

Group A

Group B

Semifinals

Third-place playoff

Final

See also
 List of World Table Tennis Championships medalists

References

-